The 1911 Australasian Championships was a tennis tournament that took place on outdoor grass courts at the Warehouseman's Cricket Ground, Melbourne, Australia. It was the 7th edition of the Australian Championships (now known as the Australian Open), the second held in Melbourne and the third Grand Slam tournament of the year.

Finals

Singles

 Norman Brookes defeated  Horace Rice  6–1, 6–2, 6–3

Doubles
 Rodney Heath /  Randolph Lycett defeated  John Addison /  Norman Brookes 6–2, 7–5, 6–0

References

External links
 Australian Open official Website

 
1911 in Australian tennis
1911
November 1911 sports events